Louis IX (25 April 1214 – 25 August 1270), commonly known as Saint Louis or Louis the Saint, was King of France from 1226 to 1270, and the most illustrious of the Direct Capetians. He was crowned in Reims at the age of 12, following the death of his father Louis VIII. His mother, Blanche of Castile, ruled the kingdom as regent until he reached maturity, and then remained his valued adviser until her death. During Louis' childhood, Blanche dealt with the opposition of rebellious vassals and secured Capetian success in the Albigensian Crusade, which had started 20 years earlier.

As an adult, Louis IX faced recurring conflicts with some of his realm's most powerful nobles, such as Hugh X of Lusignan and Peter of Dreux. Simultaneously, Henry III of England attempted to restore the Angevin continental possessions, but was promptly routed at the Battle of Taillebourg. Louis annexed several provinces, notably parts of Aquitaine, Maine and Provence. Honoring a vow he had made while praying for recovery during a serious illness, Louis IX led the ill-fated Seventh Crusade and Eighth Crusade against the Muslim dynasties that ruled North Africa, Egypt and the Holy Land. He was captured and ransomed during the Seventh Crusade, and later died of dysentery during the Eighth Crusade. He was succeeded by his son Philip III.

Louis IX reformed the French legal process, creating a royal justice system in which petitioners could appeal judgements directly to the king. He banned trials by ordeal, tried to end private wars, and introduced the presumption of innocence to criminal procedures. To enforce his new legal system, the king created provosts and bailiffs. Louis IX enjoyed immense prestige throughout European Christendom. His reign is often remembered as an economic and political golden age for the Kingdom of France during the Middle Ages. He was largely admired by fellow European rulers and was sometimes asked to arbitrate disputes outside of his kingdom.

His admirers through the centuries have regarded Louis IX as the ideal Christian ruler. His skill as a knight and engaging manner with the public made him popular, though contemporaries occasionally rebuked him as a "monk king". Despite his liberalizing legal reforms, Louis was a devout Christian and enforced strict Catholic orthodoxy. He passed severe laws punishing blasphemy and targeted France's Jews, including the burning of the Talmud after the Disputation of Paris. He is the only canonized king of France.

Sources
Much of what is known of Louis's life comes from Jean de Joinville's famous Life of Saint Louis. Joinville was a close friend, confidant, and counselor to the king. He participated as a witness in the papal inquest into Louis's life that resulted in his canonization in 1297 by Pope Boniface VIII.

Two other important biographies were written by the king's confessor, Geoffrey of Beaulieu, and his chaplain, William of Chartres. While several individuals wrote biographies in the decades following the king's death, only Jean of Joinville, Geoffrey of Beaulieu, and William of Chartres wrote from personal knowledge of the king and of the events they describe, and all three are biased favorably to the king. The fourth important source of information is William of Saint-Parthus's 19th-century biography, which he wrote using material from the papal inquest mentioned above.

Early life
Louis was born on 25 April 1214 at Poissy, near Paris, the son of Louis the Lion and Blanche of Castile, and was baptized there in La Collégiale Notre-Dame church. His grandfather on his father's side was Philip II, king of France; his grandfather on his mother's side was Alfonso VIII, king of Castile. Tutors of Blanche's choosing taught him Latin, public speaking, writing, military arts, and government. He was nine years old when his grandfather Philip II died and his father became King Louis VIII.

Louis was 12 years old when his father died on 8 November 1226. He was crowned king within the month at Reims Cathedral. His mother, Blanche, ruled France as regent during his minority. Louis's mother instilled in him her devout Christianity. She is once recorded to have said:

His younger brother Charles I of Sicily (1227–85) was created count of Anjou, thus founding the Capetian Angevin dynasty.

While his contemporaries viewed his reign as co-rule between the king and his mother, historians generally believe Louis began ruling personally in 1234, with his mother assuming a more advisory role. She continued to have a strong influence on the king until her death in 1252.

Marriage
On 27 May 1234, Louis married Margaret of Provence (1221–1295); she was crowned in the cathedral of Sens the next day. Margaret was the sister of Eleanor of Provence, who later married Henry III of England.  The new queen's religious zeal made her a well-suited partner for the king, and they are attested to have gotten along well, enjoying riding together, reading, and listening to music. His closeness to Margaret aroused jealousy in his mother, who tried to keep the couple apart as much as she could.

The Crusades of Saint Louis
In 1229, when Louis was 15, his mother ended the Albigensian Crusade by signing an agreement with Raymond VII of Toulouse. Raymond VI of Toulouse had been suspected of ordering the assassination of Pierre de Castelnau, a Roman Catholic preacher who attempted to convert the Cathars.

Louis went on two crusades: the Seventh Crusade in 1248 and the Eighth Crusade in 1270.

Seventh Crusade

Louis and his followers landed in Egypt on 4 or 5 June 1249 and began their campaign with the capture of the port of Damietta. This attack caused some disruption in the Muslim Ayyubid empire, especially as the current sultan, Al-Malik as-Salih Najm al-Din Ayyub, was on his deathbed. However, the march of Europeans from Damietta toward Cairo through the Nile River Delta went slowly. The seasonal rising of the Nile and the summer heat made it impossible for them to advance. During this time, the Ayyubid sultan died, and the sultan's wife Shajar al-Durr set in motion a shift in power that would make her Queen and eventually result in the rule of the Egyptian army of the Mamluks.

On 8 February 1250, Louis lost his army at the Battle of Al Mansurah and was captured by the Egyptians. His release was eventually negotiated in return for a ransom of 400,000 livres tournois (roughly 80 million USD today) and the surrender of the city of Damietta.

Four years in the Kingdom of Jerusalem
Following his release from Egyptian captivity, Louis spent four years in the Kingdom of Jerusalem, namely in Acre, Caesarea, and Jaffa. He used his wealth to assist the Crusaders in rebuilding their defenses and conducted diplomacy with the Islamic powers of Syria and Egypt. In the spring of 1254, he and his surviving army returned to France.

Louis exchanged multiple letters and emissaries with Mongol rulers of the period. During his first crusade in 1248, Louis was approached by envoys from Eljigidei, the Mongol military commander stationed in Armenia and Persia. Eljigidei suggested that King Louis should land in Egypt while Eljigidei attacked Baghdad, in order to prevent the Muslims of Egypt and Syria from joining forces. Louis sent André de Longjumeau, a Dominican priest, as an emissary to the Great Khan Güyük Khan (r. 1246–48) in Mongolia. Güyük died before the emissary arrived at his court, however, and Güyük's queen and now regent, Oghul Qaimish, turned down the diplomatic offer.

Louis dispatched another envoy to the Mongol court, the Franciscan William of Rubruck, who visited the Great Khan Möngke (1251–1259) in Mongolia. He spent several years at the Mongol court. In 1259, Berke, the ruler of the Golden Horde, demanded the submission of Louis. By contrast, Mongolian emperors Möngke and Khubilai's brother, the Ilkhan Hulegu, sent a letter to the king of France seeking his military assistance, but the letter never reached France.

Eighth Crusade

In a parliament held at Paris, 24 March 1267, Louis and his three sons "took the cross." On hearing the reports of the missionaries, Louis resolved to land at Tunis, and he ordered his younger brother, Charles of Anjou, to join him there. The crusaders, among whom was the English prince Edward Longshanks, landed at Carthage 17 July 1270, but disease broke out in the camp. Many died of dysentery, and on 25 August, Louis himself died.

Patron of arts and arbiter of Europe
Louis's patronage of the arts inspired much innovation in Gothic art and architecture. The style of his court was influential throughout Europe, both because of artwork purchased from Parisian masters for export, and by the marriage of the king's daughters and other female relatives to foreigners. They became emissaries of Parisian models and styles elsewhere. Louis's personal chapel, the Sainte-Chapelle in Paris, which was known for its intricate stained-glass windows, was copied more than once by his descendants elsewhere. Louis is believed to have ordered the production of the Morgan Bible and the Arsenal Bible, both deluxe illuminated manuscripts.

During the so-called "golden century of Saint Louis", the kingdom of France was at its height in Europe, both politically and economically. Saint Louis was regarded as "primus inter pares", first among equals, among the kings and rulers of the continent. He commanded the largest army and ruled the largest and wealthiest kingdom, the European centre of arts and intellectual thought at the time. The foundations for the notable college of theology, later known as the Sorbonne, were laid in Paris about the year 1257.

The prestige and respect felt by Europeans for King Louis IX were due more to the appeal of his personality than to military domination. For his contemporaries, he was the quintessential example of the Christian prince and embodied the whole of Christendom in his person. His reputation for fairness and even saintliness was already well established while he was alive, and on many occasions he was chosen as an arbiter in quarrels among the rulers of Europe.

Shortly before 1256, Enguerrand IV, Lord of Coucy, arrested and without trial hanged three young squires of Laon, whom he accused of poaching in his forest. In 1256 Louis had the lord arrested and brought to the Louvre by his sergeants. Enguerrand demanded judgment by his peers and trial by battle, which the king refused because he thought it obsolete. Enguerrand was tried, sentenced, and ordered to pay 12,000 livres. Part of the money was to pay for masses to be said in perpetuity for the souls of the men he had hanged.

In 1258, Louis and James I of Aragon signed the Treaty of Corbeil to end areas of contention between them. By this treaty, Louis renounced his feudal overlordship over the County of Barcelona and Roussillon, which was held by the King of Aragon. James in turn renounced his feudal overlordship over several counties in southern France, including Provence and Languedoc. In 1259 Louis signed the Treaty of Paris, by which Henry III of England was confirmed in his possession of territories in southwestern France, and Louis received the provinces of Anjou, Normandy (Normandie), Poitou, Maine, and Touraine.

Religious nature

The perception of Louis IX by his contemporaries as the exemplary Christian prince was reinforced by his religious zeal. Louis was an extremely devout Catholic, and he built the Sainte-Chapelle ("Holy Chapel"), located within the royal palace complex (now the Paris Hall of Justice), on the Île de la Cité in the centre of Paris. The Sainte Chapelle, a prime example of the Rayonnant style of Gothic architecture, was erected as a shrine for what Louis believed to be the Crown of Thorns and a fragment of the True Cross, supposed precious relics of the Passion of Christ. He acquired these in 1239–41 from Emperor Baldwin II of the Latin Empire of Constantinople by agreeing to pay off Baldwin's debt to the Venetian merchant Niccolo Quirino, for which Baldwin had pledged the Crown of Thorns as collateral. Louis IX paid the exorbitant sum of 135,000 livres to clear the debt.

In 1230, the King forbade all forms of usury, defined at the time as any taking of interest and therefore covering most banking activities. Louis used these anti-usury laws to extract funds from Jewish and Lombard moneylenders, with the hopes that it would help pay for a future crusade. Louis also oversaw the Disputation of Paris in 1240, in which Paris's Jewish leaders were imprisoned and forced to admit to anti-Christian passages in the Talmud, the major source of Jewish commentaries on the Bible and religious law. As a result of the disputation, Pope Gregory IX declared that all copies of the Talmud should be seized and destroyed. In 1243, Louis ordered the burning of 12,000 Talmudim, along with other important Jewish books and scripture. The edict against the Talmud was eventually overturned by Gregory IX's successor, Innocent IV.

Louis also expanded the scope of the Inquisition in France. He set the punishment for blasphemy to mutilation of the tongue and lips. The area most affected by this expansion was southern France, where the Cathar sect had been strongest. The rate of confiscation of property from the Cathars and others reached its highest levels in the years before his first crusade and slowed upon his return to France in 1254.

In 1250, Louis headed a crusade to Egypt and was taken prisoner. During his captivity, he recited the Divine Office every day. After his release against ransom, he visited the Holy Land before returning to France. In these deeds, Louis IX tried to fulfill what he considered the duty of France as "the eldest daughter of the Church" (la fille aînée de l'Église), a tradition of protector of the Church going back to the Franks and Charlemagne, who had been crowned by Pope Leo III in Rome in 800. The kings of France were known in the Church by the title "most Christian king" (Rex Christianissimus).

Louis founded many hospitals and houses: the House of the Filles-Dieu for reformed prostitutes; the Quinze-Vingt for 300 blind men (1254), and hospitals at Pontoise, Vernon, and Compiégne.

St. Louis installed a house of the Trinitarian Order at Fontainebleau, his chateau and estate near Paris. He chose Trinitarians as his chaplains and was accompanied by them on his crusades. In his spiritual testament he wrote, "My dearest son, you should permit yourself to be tormented by every kind of martyrdom before you would allow yourself to commit a mortal sin."

Louis authored and sent the Enseignements, or teachings, to his son Philip III. The letter outlined how Philip should follow the example of Jesus Christ in order to be a moral leader. The letter is estimated to have been written in 1267, three years before Louis's death.

Children
Blanche (12 July/4 December 1240 – 29 April 1244), died in infancy.
Isabella (2 March 1241 – 28 January 1271), married Theobald II of Navarre.
Louis (23 September 1243/24 February 1244 – 11 January/2 February 1260). Betrothed to Berengaria of Castile in Paris on 20 August 1255.
Philip III (1 May 1245 – 5 October 1285), married firstly to Isabella of Aragon in 1262 and secondly to Maria of Brabant in 1274.
John (1246/1247 – 10 March 1248), died in infancy.
John Tristan (8 April 1250 – 3 August 1270), Count of Valois, married Yolande II, Countess of Nevers.
Peter (1251 – 6/7 April 1284), Count of Perche and Alençon, married Joanne of Châtillon.
Blanche (early 1253 – 17 June 1320), married Ferdinand de la Cerda, Infante of Castile.
Margaret (early 1255 – July 1271), married John I, Duke of Brabant.
Robert (1256 – 7 February 1317), Count of Clermont, married Beatrice of Burgundy. The French crown devolved upon his male-line descendant, Henry IV (the first Bourbon king), when the legitimate male line of Philip III died out in 1589.
Agnes (1260 – 19/20 December 1327), married Robert II, Duke of Burgundy.

Louis and Margaret's two children who died in infancy were first buried at the Cistercian abbey of Royaumont. In 1820 they were transferred and reinterred to Saint-Denis Basilica.

Death and legacy

Louis died at Tunis on 25 August 1270, in an epidemic of dysentery that swept through his army. According to European custom, his body was subjected to the process known as mos Teutonicus prior to his remains being returned to France. Louis was succeeded as King of France by his son, Philip III.

Louis's younger brother, Charles I of Naples, preserved his heart and intestines, and conveyed them for burial in the cathedral of Monreale near Palermo. Louis's bones were carried overland in a lengthy processional across Sicily, Italy, the Alps, and France, until they were interred in the royal necropolis at Saint-Denis in May 1271. Charles and Philip III later dispersed a number of relics to promote Louis's veneration.

Ancestry

Veneration as a saint

Pope Boniface VIII proclaimed the canonization of Louis in 1297; he is the only French king to be declared a saint. Louis IX is often considered the model of the ideal Christian monarch.

Named in his honour, the Sisters of Charity of St. Louis is a Roman Catholic religious order founded in Vannes, France, in 1803. A similar order, the Sisters of St Louis, was founded in Juilly in 1842.

He is honoured as co-patron of the Third Order of St. Francis, which claims him as a member of the Order. When he became king, over a hundred poor people were served meals in his house on ordinary days. Often the king served these guests himself. His acts of charity, coupled with his devout religious practices, gave rise to the legend that he joined the Third Order of St. Francis, though it is unlikely that he ever actually joined the order.

The Catholic Church and Episcopal Church honor him with a feast day on August 25.

Things named after Saint Louis

 The French royal Order of Saint Louis (1693–1790 and 1814–1830)

Places
Many countries in which French speakers and Catholicism were prevalent named places after King Louis:
San Luis Province in Argentina; 
San Luis Potosí in Mexico; 
Multiple locations in the United States
St. Louis, Missouri, named by French colonists 
Multiple locations in France
Île Saint-Louis, an island in the river Seine, Paris, France
Saint-Louis, New Caledonia
Multiple locations in Canada
Saint-Louis, Senegal;
São Luís, Maranhão in Brazil
The Philippines
San Luis, Aurora in the Philippines
San Luis, Batangas in the Philippines

Buildings 

 France
 A hospital in the 10th arrondissement of Paris
 The Cathédrale Saint-Louis de Versailles in Versailles
 United States
 The Basilica of St. Louis, King of France,  completed in 1834 in St. Louis, Missouri  
 The Cathedral Basilica of St. Louis,  completed in 1914 in St. Louis, Missouri 
 The St. Louis Cathedral in New Orleans
 Saint Louis Catholic High School, in Lake Charles, Louisiana
 Saint Louis King of France Catholic Church and School, in Austin, Texas
 Saint Louis Catholic Church, in Waco, Texas
Mission San Luis Rey de Francia, Oceanside, California, founded June 12, 1798
 The national church of France in Rome: San Luigi dei Francesi in Italian, or Saint Louis of France in English.
 The Cathedral of St Louis in Plovdiv, Bulgaria
 The Cathedral of St Louis in Carthage, Tunisia, so named because Louis IX died at that approximate location in 1270
 The Church of St Louis in Moscow, Russia
 Rue Saint Louis of Pondicherry, India.
 The Convent of Saint Louis and Catholic High School in Carrickmacross, Ireland.

Notable portraits 

 United States
 A bas-relief of St. Louis is one of the carved portraits of historic lawmakers that adorn the chamber of the United States House of Representatives.
 Saint Louis is also portrayed on a frieze depicting a timeline of important lawgivers throughout world history, on the North Wall of the Courtroom at the Supreme Court of the United States.
 A statue of St. Louis by the sculptor John Donoghue stands on the roofline of the New York State Appellate Division Court at 27 Madison Avenue in New York City.
 The Apotheosis of St. Louis is an equestrian statue of the saint, by Charles Henry Niehaus, that stands in front of the Saint Louis Art Museum in Forest Park.
 A heroic portrait by Baron Charles de Steuben hangs in the Basilica of the National Shrine of the Assumption of the Blessed Virgin Mary in Baltimore.  An 1821 gift of King Louis XVIII of France, it depicts St. Louis burying his plague-stricken troops before the siege of Tunis at the beginning of the Eighth Crusade in 1270.

In fiction
Davis, William Stearns, "Falaise of the Blessed Voice" aka "The White Queen". New York, NY: Macmillan, 1904
Peter Berling, The Children of the Grail
Jules Verne, "To the Sun?/Off on a Comet!" A comet takes several bits of the Earth away when it grazes the Earth. Some people, taken up at the same time, find the Tomb of Saint Louis is one of the bits, as they explore the comet.
Adam Gidwitz, The Inquisitor's Tale
Dante Alighieri, Divina Commedia. It is likely that Dante hides the figure of the Saint King behind the Veltro, the Messo di Dio, the Veglio di Creta and the "515", which is a duplicate of the Messo. This is a trinitarian representation to oppose to the analogous representation of his nephew Philip IV the Fair, as the Beast from the Sea. The idea came to Dante from the transposition of the Revelation of St. John in the history, studied from the abbot and theologian Joachim of Fiore.

Music

Arnaud du Prat, Paris canon; Rhymed, chanted office for St. Louis, 1290, Sens Bib. Mun. MS6, and elsewhere.
Marc-Antoine Charpentier, Motet for Saint Louis, H.320, for 1 voice, 2 treble instruments (?) and continuo 1675.
Marc-Antoine Charpentier, Motet In honorem santi Ludovici Regis Galliae canticum tribus vocibus cum symphonia, H.323, for 3 voices, 2 treble instruments and continuo (1678 ?)
Marc-Antoine Charpentier, Motet In honorem Sancti Ludovici regis Galliae, H.332, for 3 voices, 2 treble instruments and continuo 1683)
Marc-Antoine Charpentier, Motet In honorem Sancti Ludovici regis Galliae canticum, H.365 & H.365 a, for soloists, chorus, woodwinds, strings and continuo (1690)
Marc-Antoine Charpentier, Motet In honorem Sancti Ludovici regis Galliae, H.418, for soloists, chorus, 2 flutes, 2 violins and continuo (1692–93)

References

Bibliography

External links

John de Joinville. Memoirs of Louis IX, King of France. Chronicle, 1309.
Saint Louis in Medieval History of Navarre
Site about The Saintonge War between Louis IX of France and Henry III of England.
Account of the first Crusade of Saint Louis from the perspective of the Arabs..
A letter from Guy, a knight, concerning the capture of Damietta on the sixth Crusade with a speech delivered by Saint Louis to his men.
Etext full version of the Memoirs of the Lord of Joinville, a biography of Saint Louis written by one of his knights
"St. Lewis, King of France", Butler's Lives of the Saints
"Man of the Middle Ages, Saint Louis, King of France", Archdiocese of St. Louis, MO

 
1214 births
1270 deaths
13th-century kings of France
People from Poissy
Burials at the Basilica of Saint-Denis
French Roman Catholic saints
House of Capet
People of the Albigensian Crusade
Christians of the Seventh Crusade
Christians of the Eighth Crusade
Medieval child monarchs
13th-century Christian saints
Pre-Reformation Anglican saints
Roman Catholic royal saints
Deaths from dysentery
Patron saints of France
Children of Louis VIII of France
Sons of kings
French art patrons
Monarchs taken prisoner in wartime